Officially, the Armenia Ethnography Museum and the National Liberation Movement, is a state-owned museum of Armenia located in the village of Araks, Armavir Province, within the Sardarapat Memorial complex, around 10 km southwest of the provincial centre Armavir.

Designed in the shape of a medieval Armenian castle by architect Rafael Israelyan, the museum was opened in 1978.

Description 
The museum building without windows castle impression. South (rear) front by two octagonal towers, one Aragat other, Ararat after the two-window opening is planned. The interior design is clear, the walls are smooth tuff carved arches, lined with high symbolic.

Collections 
Collection of Armenia Museum of Ethnography and the national liberation movement contains 70 thousand sets.

The materials of the Museum of the Highlands and culture of the inhabitants of the Stone Age to our days. It contains.
Hunting and primitive working tools,
ceramics, stone work, metallurgy unique designs,
petroglyphs
household and ritual vessels,
weapons;
Musical Instruments 
 jewelry and other items from the period of early human society groups.

Here includes collections in a 3-1 millennial reached us in clay, stone and metal carriages, statues and “pashtpanmunkayin” subjects.

Gallery

See also 
Sardarapat Memorial

References

Sources 
What is, Encyclopedia, Volume 3, page 25.

External links
About Armenian Ethnography Museum

Museums in Armenia
Buildings and structures in Armavir Province
Tourist attractions in Armavir Province
Ethnographic museums in Asia